College Field is a cricket ground in Saint Peter Port, Guernsey. It hosted matches in the 2009 ICC World Cricket League Division Seven tournament, and hosted matches in the Regional Finals of the 2018–19 ICC World Twenty20 Europe Qualifier tournament in June 2019.

References

Sport in Guernsey